Claire Meghnagi (born 1977) is an Israeli operatic soprano of Italian origin.

Biography
Claire Meghnagi was born in Israel in 1977 to Italian-born cantor Isacco Meghnagi. She studied in Rubin Academy of Music (now the Buchmann-Mehta School of Music) in Tel Aviv. After graduation Meghnagi continued her studies in Boston and New York. Her works included Tullia in Bononcini's , Le Feu/La Princesse in L'enfant et les sortilèges, Granddaughter in The Rat Laughed for Israeli Chamber Orchestra, Zerlina in Don Giovanni, staged in Haifa, Despina in Così fan tutte, La Bergère in Armide, Prima Cercatrice in Suor Angelica in Israeli Opera,  First Innocent in The Minotaur in Royal Opera House in London. She participated in Vocal Fantasy Festival in Jerusalem in 2017.

Notable performances
 Aci, Galatea e Polifemo by George Frideric Handel. As Aci. With Les Arts Florissants (ensemble)

References

External links
Claire Meghnagi on Israeli Opera site

Israeli operatic sopranos
1977 births
Living people